José Carbilio Tomasino, (born - died 7 February 1960) was a Salvadoran footballer coach.

Tomasino led the El Salvador team to the Central American and Caribbean titles in 1954.
he is the father of salvadoran football coach Ricardo Tomasino.

International career
On May 1, 1929 he made his international debut for El Salvador in a unofficial friendly against Universidad de Nicaragua, where he also got his first goal, scoring the third in a 3-0 victory. He represented his country at the 1930 Central American Games.
Tomasino played for the El Salvador national football team from 1929 to 1930 earning 5 caps.

Manager career
After retiring as a player Carbilio became a coach, He coached the El Salvador national football team and helping to win the 1954 Central American and Caribbean Games title, El Salvador second International title.
He Later went on to coach to FAS.

References

External links
 

Salvadoran footballers
Salvadoran football managers
Sportspeople from Santa Ana, El Salvador
Association football midfielders
Year of birth missing
1960 deaths